Pyrohiv, also known as Pirogov, originally a village south of Kyiv, is a neighborhood in the southern outskirts of the Ukrainian capital city. It is now home to an outdoor Museum of Folk Architecture and Life of Ukraine.

Although the origin of the toponym is uncertain, pyrohiv is genitive plural form of the Ukrainian word for pie.

Location
Archaeological evidence confirms that the territory of Pyrohiv has been settled at the times of the Bronze Age. Pyrohivka settlement was first mentioned in 1627, as a feudal domain of the Kyivan Cave Monastery. The 1720 records mention the village of Pyrozhov. The territory was included within the Kyiv administrative boundary in 1957.

Two modern streets now go along the historic road Pyrohiv way (Pyrohivs'kyi Shlyakh): the Stolychne Shose (Capital Motorway) and Novopyrohivska (New Pyrohiv) Street..

Museum

The territory of historic Pyrohiv now serves as the location of a  outdoor Museum of Folk Architecture and Life of Ukraine. Founded in 1969, the museum contains over 300 pieces of folk architecture brought here from all parts of Ukraine and carefully reassembled. The picturesque hill with several windmills is the museum centrepiece and the entire territory of the museum is divided into sectors, each representing the folk architecture and life of a specific Ukrainian region. 
The oldest church, situated in Pyrohiv, is Naddnipryanska, it is built in 1742. In the museum, you can also find more than 40 000 items of household and traditional culture such as costumes, old textiles, embroidery, carpets, ceramics, metal handicrafts, woodwork and glassware as well as musical instruments, paintings and houseware.

Commoner's homes, buildings of small trade, commerce and local administration, and old wooden village churches contain authentic items that represent the everyday lifestyle of Ukrainian villagers and townsfolk. Local volunteers and modern Ukrainian artisans selling their wares dress in old-style clothes and demonstrating the use of authentic everyday items to visitors.

One of the main distinctive features of the museum is its theatrical performances and open-air celebrations dedicated to different folk holidays. Also in Pyrohiv, you can often meet workers of the museum and visitors who are dressed in national costumes as well as those who are participating in ancient crafts like weaving, molding and others. In autumn and in summer holidays folk crafts take place here. Blacksmiths, potters, weavers and other masters show their crafts to the public and create works of art in front of your eyes.

Pyrohiv museum has been accorded the status of the State Museum of Ukraine and is affiliated with the Institute of Arts, Folklore and Ethnology of the National Academy of Science of Ukraine.

To get to the museum from the underground station Demiivska take the trolley bus №11 or from the underground station Demiivska or Golosiivska the minibus taxi №172 and 156.
The museum’s working hours are from 10 a.m. to 5 p.m. There are excursions for tourists in English, Ukrainian, Russian and German.

Recent controversies
 
In recent years, several of the museum's wooden buildings have been damaged by fires. The most recent fire on September 15, 2006 completely destroyed one house and seriously damaged two others. According to both Institute Director Hanna Skrypnyk and the Ukrainian Ministry of Emergencies, the fire was the result of arson, set to cover up the theft of a valuable collection of eighteenth-century cassoni which were exhibited in the burned building. Skrypnyk noted that in Soviet times the museum had a designated security group and fire house, which were disbanded after the Soviet collapse owing to negligence in financing on the part of the Ukrainian government.

The land usage in the vicinity of the museum has become the centre of scandal as the local authorities approved several commercial construction projects, including a luxurious high-rise entertainment complex and a gasoline filling station. The construction work for the former is now stalled due to public outrage, but the work on building the filling station near the museum entrance has proceeded.

See also
 Petro Tronko

References

  Museum of Folk Architecture and Life at Wiki WWW-Encyclopedia of Kyiv
  Pyrohiv at Wiki WWW-Encyclopedia of Kyiv
 Museum of Folk Architecture and Life. Photo gallery
  Natalya Blyznyuk, The Pyrohiv museum is in danger, Ukrayina i Svit, March 3, 2006, in Russian, in Ukrainian.
  Vladimir Kaminsky, Is the Pyrohiv museum in danger?, Sevodnya, March 3, 2006
  The Pyrohiv museum in Kyiv was almost burnt, Gazeta po-kievski, August 16, 2006
  "The scientists think that the fires in Pyrohiv are used to cover the theft from the museum", September 26, 2006, Korrespondent.net, in Russian, in Ukrainian
  "The damage from Pyrihiv fire is estimated at 4 mln UAH", September 25, 2006, Glavred.info.
 Video from Pyrohiv (4k, UltraHD)

Neighborhoods in Kyiv
Open-air museums in Ukraine
Ethnographic museums in Ukraine
History museums in Ukraine
2017 Action Romance movie Bitter Harvest Feature Film about Ukraines Genocide Holodomor 1932/33 by soviet Russian communist dictator Stalin was filmed on location in Pyrohiv Kyiv district outdoor museum in  Ukraine depicting the authentic Ukrainian land and village timber and thatched roof huts and cabin homes and old 18th cent.timber Orthodox churches in the first ever English language feature drama love war story. The idea and screenplay was written by Canadian half-Ukrainian Richard Bachynsky Hoover from Kingston Ontario living in Toronto who visited Ukraine and toured Pirohiv museum in 1999 for the first time with his dear friend Sofia Karayim from Lviv west Ukraine. At Pirohiv they both rode beautiful white horses with a Ukrainian Cossack rider who rented a few horses for tourist to ride. The then struggling actor later screenwriter recalled saying seated saddled on his horse to  Sofia.. "What a great place to make a Ukrainian Cossack movie" which ironically came true several years later after writing his first film script in 2013 his dream became reality for Richard and the Canadian and Ukrainian film crew and all cast filming there after his Canadian Ukrainian backer producer from Toronto Ian Ihnatowycz saw Richards many photos he took prior in the summer of 2012 of the authentic timber huts and churches etc. of Pirohova prior with his then-girlfriend from Kyiv  Olena Chernova to present as possible film locations. 
British actor Terence Stamp and Canadian actor Barry Pepper were cast in the film as Holodny Yar Cossacks with actors Max Irons, Samantha Barks, Tamer Hasan and Lucy Brown ironically Stamp and Pepper rode beautiful white stallions at the exact same Orthodox timber church and windmill the writer Richard rode white stallions with a Cossack rider he still has in a photo from his collection of 1999 Ukraine visit at Pyrohiv.
The film actor screenwriter wrote the film story and script over the years raising his son Yevhen (Genya ) Nyanchenko born in 2008 living in Kyiv district small city of Bucha Ukraine was born in the city Smila Cherkashyna region which Pirohova outdoor ethnic museum doubles as Smila as a village near the Tyasmin river there in the film which his son and all his family swim in every summer which he decided should reflect in the film when it was a rural Cossack family idealic setting and sunflower wheat livestock later soviet collective farming area in 1930s and where he raised his son Yevhen with Alona Nyanchenko the boy's mother and her family there the first two years of their son's life growing up as a toddler.
See Bitter Harvest film website and movie Trailer below depicting  Pyrohiv museum as the suburban Cossack farming village of Smila which today is now a city.

www.bitterharvestfilm.com